Next is the third studio album by Journey, released in 1977. The band continued the formula from 1976's Look into the Future but this album also retains some of their jazzy progressive rock style from the first album. It is the last album to feature Gregg Rolie as the primary lead singer. "Spaceman"/"Nickel and Dime" was the single released from Next.

The instrumental "Cookie Duster" was listed in very early pressings of the album, though not actually included on the album. It was later released on Journey's Time³ compilation.

Next reached No. 85 on the Billboard 200 Albums charts.

Although he did not contribute to Next, lead vocalist Robert Fleischman joined Journey shortly after the album's release as a songwriter and the group's first dedicated frontman, sharing lead vocal duties with Rolie during subsequent live shows.  All of the songs on the album vanished from the band's live setlist after 1979 and two ("Spaceman" and "Here We Are") have never been performed live.

Reception

Retrospectively, AllMusic Stephen Thomas Erlewine wrote that "without a forceful lead vocalist like Steve Perry, the group lacks focus and a pop sensibility and its attempts at straight-ahead pop/rock suffer considerably as a result." Canadian journalist Martin Popoff praised the album's variety and the "profusion of good songs", with the musical styles ranging from prog to sophisticated balladry to pop metal.

Track listing

Personnel

Band members
 Gregg Rolie – keyboards, lead vocals
 Neal Schon – electric and acoustic guitars, lead vocals on "I Would Find You" and "Karma"
 Ross Valory – bass guitar, backing vocals
 Aynsley Dunbar – drums, percussion

Additional personnel
 Smiggy – engineer, mixing
 Bruce Botnick – mastering
 Herbie Herbert – director
 Bruce Steinberg – art direction, design, photography, cover design
 Ellie Oberzil – design
 Mansfield – sleeve art

Charts

References

External links 
 Journey - Next (1977) album review by Stephen Thomas Erlewine, credits and releases at AllMusic.com
 Journey - Next (1977) album releases & credits at Discogs.com
 Journey - Next (1977) album to be listened as stream at Play.Spotify.com

1977 albums
Journey (band) albums
Columbia Records albums